The Lucky Corner is a 1936 Our Gang short comedy film directed by Gus Meins. It was the 143rd Our Gang short to be released.

Plot
Scotty and his grandfather Gus are the proprietors of a sidewalk lemonade stand. The small operation struggles to compete with the ornate sidewalk diner run by Leonard's father. Leonard is too engrossed in his comic book to pay attention to waiting customers, and when they leave he whines to his father, who gets a policeman to force Gus and Scotty from their corner. Buckwheat's father, a boot black, offers Gus room to set up his stand, while Spanky, Alfalfa, and the other kids stage a parade and an impromptu talent show to draw customers to Gus's booth.

After some misadventures with Buckwheat (who cannot read) putting starch instead of sugar in the lemonade (Leonard does not know this when he steals the lemonade; the customers spit it out and call the same policeman), Gus and Scotty's business starts to thrive. Then Leonard comes over to belabor the gang for "doping" the lemonade, just before Spanky slips an electric scalp-massager into Leonard's pants. Spanky then connects and disconnects the plug, starting and stopping the device and causing Leonard to writhe around in front of a gathering crowd in a weird snake dance, while Spanky's band plays "Stars and Stripes Forever".

Notes
A sequel to For Pete's Sake! (which also featured William Wagner and Leonard Kibrick as a father/son villain team), The Lucky Corner was filmed and completed in mid-1935. However, the short was withheld from release until March 1936, by which time Scotty Beckett, one of the principal Our Gang kids in the short, had departed the series.
In 1971, King World, who distributed the Our Gang shorts to television as The Little Rascals, edited parts of The Lucky Corner with content it deemed to be possibly racially insensitive or offensive. These edits were later reinstated when The Little Rascals aired on the AMC cable TV network between 2001 and 2003.

Cast

The Gang
 Scotty Beckett as Scotty
 George McFarland as Spanky
 Carl Switzer as Alfalfa
 Billie Thomas as Buckwheat
 Gloria Brown as Gloria
 Alvin Buckelew as Alvin
 Marianne Edwards as Marianne
 Harold Switzer as Harold
 Billy Minderhout as Our Gang member
 Donald Proffitt as Our Gang member
 Merrill Strong as Our Gang member
 Pete the Pup as himself

Additional cast
 Leonard Kibrick as Leonard
 Ernie Alexander as First customer
 Joe Bordeaux as Painter
 Bobby Dunn as Customer accused of 'poisoning' officer
 Gus Leonard as Gus, Scotty's Grandpa
 Charles Lloyd as Barber
 Joe Mathey as Buckwheat's father
 James C. Morton as Officer
 Art Rowlands as Customer who screams
 William Wagner as Leonard's father
 John Collum as Crowd extra
 Bunny Brownson as Crowd extra
 Lester Dorr as Crowd extra
 Jack Hill as Crowd extra
 Fred Holmes as Crowd extra
 Jack Lipson as Crowd extra
 Sam Lufkin as Crowd extra
 Priscilla Lyon as Undetermined role
 Tommy McFarland as Undetermined role
 Snooky Valentine as Undetermined role

See also
 Our Gang filmography

References

External links

http://theluckycorner.com/rmt/138.html

1936 films
American black-and-white films
1936 comedy films
Films directed by Gus Meins
Hal Roach Studios short films
Our Gang films
1936 short films
1930s American films